The 2020–21 Kansas Jayhawks women's basketball team represented the University of Kansas in the 2020–21 NCAA Division I women's basketball season. The Jayhawks were led by sixth year head coach Brandon Schneider. They played their home games at Allen Fieldhouse in Lawrence, Kansas as members of the Big 12 Conference.

They finished the season 7–18, 3–15 in Big 12 play to finish in a tie for ninth place. As the ninth seed in the Big 12 Tournament, they lost to TCU in the First Round.  They were not invited to the NCAA tournament or the WNIT.

Previous season

The Jayhawks finished the season 15–14, 4–14 in Big 12 play to finish in last place. The Big 12 Tournament, NCAA women's basketball tournament and WNIT were all cancelled before they began due to the COVID-19 pandemic.

Roster

Schedule and results 

Source:

|-
!colspan=6 style=| Regular season

|-
!colspan=6 style=| Big 12 Tournament

Rankings

The Coaches Poll did not release a Week 2 poll and the AP Poll did not release a poll after the NCAA Tournament.

See also 
 2020–21 Kansas Jayhawks men's basketball team

References 

Kansas Jayhawks women's basketball seasons
Kansas
Kansas Jayhawks women's basketball
Kansas Jayhawks women's basketball